Xiao Qingsong (born 3 April 1963) is a Chinese volleyball player. He competed in the men's tournament at the 1984 Summer Olympics.

References

1963 births
Living people
Chinese men's volleyball players
Olympic volleyball players of China
Volleyball players at the 1984 Summer Olympics
Place of birth missing (living people)